Sara Bonifacio (born 3 July 1996) is an Italian volleyball player who plays for Igor Gorgonzola Novara.

Career
Bonifacio joined the amateur volleyball club of Alba in 2005 then she was recruited for Club Italia a junior team managed by FIPAV. She signed with Igor Gorgonzola Novara in 2014. Bonifacio plays as blocker. She was selected to play the Italian League All-Star game in 2017.

Personal life
She was born in Alba, Piedmont to a Nigerian mother and Italian father.

Awards

Clubs
 2014-15 Italian Cup –  Champion, with Igor Gorgonzola Novara  
 2016-17 Italian Championship –  Champion, with Igor Gorgonzola Novara

References

1996 births
Living people
People from Alba, Piedmont
Italian women's volleyball players
Italian people of Nigerian descent
Italian sportspeople of African descent
Serie A1 (women's volleyball) players
Sportspeople from the Province of Cuneo